The Swirling Eddies are an American rock band that began as an anonymous spinoff from the band Daniel Amos, along with new drummer David Raven.

Career
For each Swirling Eddies release, band members adopted pseudonyms for the liner notes; "Camarillo Eddy" (Terry Scott Taylor), "Berger Roy Al" (Tim Chandler), "Gene Pool" (Greg Flesch), "Arthur Fhardy" (Rob Watson), "Spot" (Jerry Chamberlain), and "Hort Elvison" (David Raven). These pseudonyms were dropped for their third album, "Zoom Daddy". Over the years new Eddies appeared on the band's albums including "Prickly Disco" (Gene Eugene), Picky Swelly, Newt York Newt York, Derry Air (Derri Daugherty), and Judy Ism. "Guest Eddies," a term used for musicians that contributed musically to one of the band's projects also made appearances on nearly every album. The list of "Guest Eddies" includes Buckeye Jazzbo, Miracle Babe, Mary Baker Eddy, Jeb McSwaggart, Mike Roe, and Eddie DeGarmo. As early as 1991, Taylor saw the Eddies as an ever-evolving and ever-growing family of like-minded musicians. At that time, in an interview with Harvest Rock Syndicate, Taylor explained that the plan was to "(open) the Eddies up to even more artists, sort of make the Eddies this conglomerate of different people that I've always wanted to work with, and have a lot of song-writing teams involved and different lead singers. Just make it this mass of people, that sort of fluctuates and changes."

The band released its debut album on Alarma Records in 1988 entitled Let's Spin!. Outdoor Elvis, released in 1989, featured the band's first two radio singles, "Driving in England" and "Hide the Beer, the Pastor's Here!". The title track included lines such as: "It's said he croons when the moon's above, singing tenderly 'Hunk of Burning Love.'" The band's documentary video, Spittle and Phlegm was released the following year.

In 2004, the band began to work on their first album of original, new material in ten years entitled The midget, the speck and the molecule. The recording sessions ended in May 2007 and the album was released on July 23, 2007.

Tim Chandler died on October 8, 2018.

Discography

Albums
 Let's Spin!, 1988 album
 Outdoor Elvis, 1989 album
 Zoom Daddy, 1994 album
 The Berry Vest of The Swirling Eddies, Best of album featured a bonus track on the tape version reversing the usual convention of the time of only putting bonus tracks on the CD, 1995 Compilation
 Sacred Cows, 1996 album
 The midget, the speck and the molecule, 2007 album

Special and limited editions
Swirling Mellow, Released numerous times between 1988 and 2008

Videography
 Spittle & Phlegm, 1990 VHS documentary
 Spittle and Phlegm, 2002 DVD documentary (Reissue)

References

External links
 The Swirling Eddies at www.DanielAmos.com
 The Swirling Eddies Discography
 The Swirling Eddies at Myspace.com

Christian rock groups from California
Musical groups from California
Musical groups established in 1988
Stunt Records artists